A Thousand Red Roses Bloom is a 1952 West German drama film directed by Alfred Braun and starring Rudolf Prack, Winnie Markus and O. W. Fischer.

The film's sets were designed by Hans Ledersteger and Ernst Richter.

Cast
Rudolf Prack as Hannes Frings
Winnie Markus as Ebba
O. W. Fischer as Andreas Mahler
Maria Holst as Marita
Otto Gebühr as Rosenbauer
Margarete Haagen as Anna
Ludwig Schmitz as Süffchen
Eugen Dumont as Der alte Frings
Josef Sieber as Jupp Siedel
Gunnar Möller as Himpemax
Kurt Reimann as Angelo
Fritz Eberth as Schaub
Lotte Rausch as Roswitha
Joachim Schütt as Der kleine Klaus
Peter Fischer as Mambo
Julia Esbach

References

External links

1952 drama films
German drama films
West German films
Films directed by Alfred Braun
Gloria Film films
German black-and-white films
1950s German films